Magnesium lactate, the magnesium salt of lactic acid, is a mineral supplement to prevent and treat low amounts of magnesium in the blood.

As a food additive, it is has the E number E329 and is used in food and beverages as an acidity regulator.

References

Magnesium compounds
Lactates